The German Artistic Gymnastics Championships  is an artistic gymnastics competition, hosted by the .

Winners

All-around

See also 
 Men's National Team
 Women's National Team

References

External links 
 German Gymnastics Federation official website

 

National championships in Germany
Germany
Gymnastics competitions in Germany